is a Japanese footballer who plays as a winger for Urawa Red Diamonds in the J1 League.

Career statistics

Club
 

1Includes Japanese Super Cup and J. League Championship.

Honours

Club
Urawa Red Diamonds
Emperor's Cup: 2021
Japanese Super Cup: 2022

References

External links
Profile at Urawa Red Diamonds 

1995 births
Living people
Association football people from Saitama Prefecture
Japanese footballers
Urawa Red Diamonds players
FC Ingolstadt 04 players
J1 League players
Japanese expatriate footballers
Japanese expatriate sportspeople in Germany
Expatriate footballers in Germany
2. Bundesliga players
Association football midfielders
FC Ingolstadt 04 II players
Sint-Truidense V.V. players